The Iligan–Marawi Road, officially the Malabang–Marawi–Iligan Road, is a , two-lane national primary road that connects the city of Iligan in Lanao del Sur to the municipality of Malabang in Lanao del Norte. It traverses through the cities and municipalities of Lanao del Sur and Lanao del Norte.

The highway is designated as National Route 77 (N77) of the Philippine highway network. It comprises Narciso Ramos Highway (Malabang-Marawi), Amai Pakpak Avenue (Marawi), Iligan-Marawi Road proper (Marawi-Iligan).

References 

Roads in Lanao del Norte
Roads in Lanao del Sur